The Quechee Gorge Bridge is a historic bridge, carrying U.S. Route 4 (US 4) across Quechee Gorge, near the Quechee village of Hartford, Vermont. Built in 1911, it is Vermont's oldest surviving steel arch bridge. It was listed on the National Register of Historic Places in 1990.

Description and history
The Quechee Gorge Bridge is located on US 4, roughly midway between Woodstock and White River Junction, Vermont. It is set high above the Ottauquechee River near the southern end of Quechee Gorge, a major local tourist attraction that is part of Quechee State Park. The arch is mounted on concrete footings, which are located near the stone abutments of the previous bridge. The bridge structure is built out of a series of panels and other steel elements, joined by rivets, and its deck consists of I-beam stringers covered by a concrete base.

The bridge was built in 1911, its trusses built by the American Bridge Company to a design by John W. Storrs, a prolific local bridge engineer. It was originally built as a railroad bridge, and was in 1933 adapted for use as a highway bridge; it is from that period that its current deck dates. It was probably built by cantilevering the arch ends over the gorge, braced by stay cables until the ends were joined. It is Vermont's oldest surviving steel arch bridge, and the only one that is spandrel-braced.

See also
 
 
 
 
 National Register of Historic Places listings in Windsor County, Vermont
 List of bridges on the National Register of Historic Places in Vermont

References

Road bridges on the National Register of Historic Places in Vermont
National Register of Historic Places in Windsor County, Vermont
Bridges completed in 1911
Bridges in Windsor County, Vermont
Buildings and structures in Hartford, Vermont
U.S. Route 4
Bridges of the United States Numbered Highway System
Steel bridges in the United States
Open-spandrel deck arch bridges in the United States
Pratt truss bridges in the United States
Truss arch bridges in the United States